Don Michael Farmer (born September 26, 1936) is a retired American basketball player and coach.  A 6'7" forward, he was selected with the third pick in the 1958 NBA draft by the New York Knicks after a college career at the University of San Francisco.  

Farmer played in the National Basketball Association (NBA) for a total of seven seasons with New York, the Cincinnati Royals, and the St. Louis Hawks.  In 1966, he coached nine games for the Baltimore Bullets.

References

External links
 BasketballReference.com: Mike Farmer (as player)
 BasketballReference.com: Mike Farmer (as coach)

1936 births
Living people
All-American college men's basketball players
American men's basketball coaches
American men's basketball players
Baltimore Bullets (1963–1973) head coaches
Basketball coaches from Oklahoma
Basketball players from Oklahoma
Cincinnati Royals players
New York Knicks draft picks
New York Knicks players
Richmond High School (Richmond, California) alumni
San Francisco Dons men's basketball players
San Francisco Saints players
Small forwards
Sportspeople from Oklahoma City
St. Louis Hawks players